The Penn State Nittany Lions football have competed in 52 bowl games compiling a record of 31–19–2 (.620). The Nittany Lions hold a 17–6–1 record in the major bowls (Rose, Orange, Sugar, Fiesta, Peach, and Cotton).

Coach Joe Paterno was responsible for most of these bids and victories, compiling more wins, 24, and appearances, 37, than any other coach in college football history, with a bowl record of 24–12–1 (.662).  Paterno also had a record of 13–4–0 in "major" bowls. Paterno is one of only two coaches in history to have competed in and won all five major bowls with the other being Bob Stoops at Oklahoma.

Key

Bowl games

Notes

References

Penn State
 
bowl games
Penn State Nittany Lions bowl games